Nemapogoninae is a fungus moth subfamily of the family Tineidae. It was described by Hinton in 1955.

Genera 
 Archinemapogon
 Dinica
 Emmochlista
 Gaedikeia
 Hyladaula
 Nemapogon
 Nemaxera
 Neurothaumasia
 Peritrana
 Triaxomasia
 Triaxomera
 Vanna

References

 , 2000: New and interesting moths from the East Palaearctic (Lepidoptera: Tineidae). Contributions to the knowledge East Palaearctic insects (11). Beiträge zur Entomologie 50 (2): 357-384.
 , 1957: Die genitalien der Paläarktischen Tineiden (Lepidoptera: Tineidae). Beiträge zur Entomologie 7 (1/2): 55-176.